Rebecca K Reilly (born 1991) is a New Zealand author. She is of Ngāti Hine and Ngāti Wai descent. Her debut novel Greta & Valdin (2021) received the 2019 Adam Foundation Prize in Creative Writing. At the 2022 Ockham New Zealand Book Awards, it was shortlisted for the Jann Medlicott Acorn Prize for Fiction and received the Hubert Church prize for the best first book of fiction.

Career
Reilly completed a Master of Arts in Creative Writing at the International Institute of Modern Letters at Victoria University of Wellington, where she was the 2019 recipient of the Adam Foundation Prize in Creative Writing for her debut novel, then titled Vines. It was subsequently renamed Greta & Valdin. The novel took her a year and a half to write, although she had been collecting material for 14 years.

Greta & Valdin was published by Victoria University Press in 2021. It is a novel about the family and romantic relationships of two siblings, both queer and of mixed Russian and Māori descent, and set in Auckland. Reviewer Hannah Tunnicliffe for Stuff said Reilly "fuses socio-political commentary with humour, making Greta & Valdin both smart and funny." Ash Davida Jane called it "the best novel of the year". Becky Manawatu praised "the tenderness Reilly achieves through her love for these characters, which translates page by page, word by word, to a love of people". Rachel O'Connor for Landfall noted a level of "information overload" but concluded "there is much to enjoy in Greta & Valdin, and hopefully much more to come from its author, whose youthful, funny voice delivers a fresh and entertaining tour of life and love in Auckland's CBD". Steve Braunias, in his list of the ten best New Zealand novels of 2021, ranked it as number one, calling it "the funniest and also the most original, enjoyable and best novel published in New Zealand in 2021".

Greta & Valdin was shortlisted for the Jann Medlicott Acorn Prize for Fiction at the 2022 Ockham New Zealand Book Awards, and was awarded the Hubert Church prize for the best first book of fiction. She was one of two Māori authors shortlisted for the Jann Medlicott award. At the time of the shortlisting announcement it was the top book on the Nielsen best-seller books chart, and The Spinoff books editor Catherine Woulfe noted that the novel "will win by miles if the judges are of a mind to nod to the national mood". The book won the Aotearoa Booksellers' Choice Award at the 2022 Aotearoa Book Trade Industry Awards. It was third on the list of New Zealand fiction bestsellers of 2022.

In September 2022 she was a judge, together with Harry Ricketts, of the Nine to Noon short story competition on Radio New Zealand. In early 2023 it was reported that Greta & Valdin would be published by Hutchinson Heinemann in the UK in early 2024 and that US rights to the novel had also been sold.

References

External links 
 Interview with Reilly, 2019, by the International Institute of Modern Letters
 Interview with Reilly, 2021, by Kete Books
 Interview with Reilly, 2021, on Radio New Zealand
 Interview with Reilly, 2022, by Stuff
 "Videotapes", short fiction by Reilly in Scum magazine
 "The Hill", an early extract from Greta & Valdin, in the journal Turbine | Kapohau

Living people
1991 births
21st-century New Zealand women writers
21st-century New Zealand novelists
Ngāti Hine people
Ngāti Wai people
International Institute of Modern Letters alumni
New Zealand Māori writers
New Zealand women novelists